General Burton may refer to:

Benjamin Burton (1855–1921), British Army major general
Edmund Burton (born 1943), British Army lieutenant general
Jefferson S. Burton (fl. 1980s–2020s), U.S. Army major general
Napier Christie Burton (1758–1835), British Army general